A tariff is a tax imposed by the government of a country or by a supranational union on imports or exports of goods. Besides being a source of revenue for the government, import duties can also be a form of regulation of foreign trade and policy that taxes foreign products to encourage or safeguard domestic industry. Protective tariffs are among the most widely used instruments of protectionism, along with import quotas and export quotas and other non-tariff barriers to trade.

Tariffs can be fixed (a constant sum per unit of imported goods or a percentage of the price) or variable (the amount varies according to the price). Taxing imports means people are less likely to buy them as they become more expensive. The intention is that they buy local products instead, boosting their country's economy. Tariffs therefore provide an incentive to develop production and replace imports with domestic products. Tariffs are meant to reduce pressure from foreign competition and reduce the trade deficit. They have historically been justified as a means to protect infant industries and to allow import substitution industrialization. Tariffs may also be used to rectify artificially low prices for certain imported goods, due to 'dumping', export subsidies or currency manipulation.

There is near unanimous consensus among economists that tariffs have a negative effect on economic growth and economic welfare, while free trade and the reduction of trade barriers has a positive effect on economic growth. Although trade liberalization can sometimes result in large and unequally distributed losses and gains, and can, in the short run, cause significant economic dislocation of workers in import-competing sectors, free trade has advantages of lowering costs of goods and services for both producers and consumers.

Etymology 

History

Ancient Greece 
In the city state of Athens, the port of Piraeus enforced a system of levies to raise taxes for the Athenian government. Grain was a key commodity that was imported through the port, and Piraeus was one of the main ports in the east Mediterranean. A levy of two percent was placed on goods arriving in the market through the docks of Piraeus. Despite the Peloponnesian War preceding year 399 BC, Piraeus had documented a tax income of 1,800 in harbor dues. The Athenian government also placed restrictions on the lending of money and transport of grain to only be allowed through the port of Piraeus.

Great Britain
In the 14th century, Edward III (1312–1377) took interventionist measures, such as banning the import of woollen cloth in an attempt to develop local woollen cloth manufacturing. Beginning in 1489, Henry VII took actions such as increasing export duties on raw wool. The Tudor monarchs, especially Henry VIII and Elizabeth I, used protectionism, subsidies, distribution of monopoly rights, government-sponsored industrial espionage and other means of government intervention to develop the wool industry, leading to England became the largest wool-producing nation in the world.

A protectionist turning point in British economic policy came in 1721, when policies to promote manufacturing industries were introduced by Robert Walpole. These included increased tariffs on imported foreign manufactured goods, and export subsidies. These policies were similar to those used by countries such as Japan, Korea and Taiwan after the Second World War.  In addition, in its colonies, Great Britain imposed a ban on advanced manufacturing activities that it did not want to see developed.  Britain also banned exports from its colonies that competed with its own products at home and abroad, forcing the colonies to leave the most profitable industries in Britain's hands.

In 1800, Britain, with about 10% of Europe's population, supplied 29% of all pig iron produced in Europe, a proportion that had risen to 45% by 1830. Per capita industrial production was even higher: in 1830 it was 250% higher than in the rest of Europe, up from 110% in 1800.

Protectionist policies of industrial promotion continued until the mid-19th century. At the beginning of that century, the average tariff on British manufactured goods was about 50%, the highest of all major European countries. Thus, according to economic historian Paul Bairoch, Britain's technological advance was achieved "behind high and enduring tariff barriers". In 1846, the country's per capita rate of industrialization was more than twice that of its closest competitors. Even after adopting free trade for most goods, Britain continued to closely regulate trade in strategic capital goods, such as machinery for the mass production of textiles.

Free trade in Britain began in earnest with the repeal of the Corn Laws in 1846, which was equivalent to free trade in grain. The Corn Acts had been passed in 1815 to restrict wheat imports and to guarantee the incomes of British farmers; their repeal devastated Britain's old rural economy, but began to mitigate the effects of the Great Famine in Ireland. Tariffs on many manufactured goods were also abolished. But while liberalism was progressing in Britain, protectionism continued on the European mainland and in the United States.

On June 15, 1903, the Secretary of State for Foreign Affairs, Henry Petty-Fitzmaurice, 5th Marquess of Lansdowne, made a speech in the House of Lords in which he defended fiscal retaliation against countries that applied high tariffs and whose governments subsidized products sold in Britain (known as "premium products", later called "dumping"). The retaliation was to take the form of threats to impose duties in response to goods from that country. Liberal unionists had split from the liberals, who advocated free trade, and this speech marked a turning point in the group's slide toward protectionism. Lansdowne argued that the threat of retaliatory tariffs was similar to gaining respect in a room of gunmen by pointing a big gun (his exact words were "a gun a little bigger than everyone else's"). The "Big Revolver" became a slogan of the time, often used in speeches and cartoons.

In response to the Great Depression, Britain finally abandoned free trade in 1932 and reintroduced tariffs on a large scale, noticing that it had lost its production capacity to protectionist countries like the United States and Weimar Germany.

United States

Before the new Constitution took effect in 1788, the Congress could not levy taxesit sold land or begged money from the states.  The new national government needed revenue and decided to depend upon a tax on imports with the Tariff of 1789. The policy of the U.S. before 1860 was low tariffs "for revenue only" (since duties continued to fund the national government). A high tariff was attempted in 1828 but the South denounced it as a "Tariff of Abominations" and it almost caused a rebellion in South Carolina until it was lowered.

Between 1816 and the end of the Second World War, the United States had one of the highest average tariff rates on manufactured imports in the world. According to Paul Bairoch, the United States was "the homeland and bastion of modern protectionism"during this period

Many American intellectuals and politicians during the country's catching-up period felt that the free trade theory advocated by British classical economists was not suited to their country. They argued that the country should develop manufacturing industries and use government protection and subsidies for this purpose, as Britain had done before them. Many of the great American economists of the time, until the last quarter of the 19th century, were strong advocates of industrial protection: Daniel Raymond who influenced Friedrich List, Mathew Carey and his son Henry, who was one of Lincoln's economic advisers. The intellectual leader of this movement was Alexander Hamilton, the first Secretary of the Treasury of the United States (1789-1795). Thus, it was against David Ricardo's theory of comparative advantage that the United States protected its industry. They pursued a protectionist policy from the beginning of the 19th century until the middle of the 20th century, after the Second World War.

In Report on Manufactures, considered the first text to express modern protectionist theory, Alexander Hamilton argued that if a country wished to develop a new activity on its soil, it would have to temporarily protect it. According to him, this protection against foreign producers could take the form of import duties or, in rare cases, prohibition of imports. He called for customs barriers to allow American industrial development and to help protect infant industries, including bounties (subsidies) derived in part from those tariffs. He also believed that duties on raw materials should be generally low. Hamilton argued that despite an initial "increase of price" caused by regulations that control foreign competition, once a "domestic manufacture has attained to perfection… it invariably becomes cheaper. He believed that political independence was predicated upon economic independence. Increasing the domestic supply of manufactured goods, particularly war materials, was seen as an issue of national security. And he feared that Britain's policy towards the colonies would condemn the United States to be only producers of agricultural products and raw materials.

Britain initially did not want to industrialize the American colonies, and implemented policies to that effect (for example, banning high value-added manufacturing activities). Under British rule, America was denied the use of tariffs to protect its new industries. This explains why, after independence, the Tariff Act of 1789 was the second bill of the Republic signed by President Washington allowing Congress to impose a fixed tariff of 5% on all imports, with a few exceptions.

The Congress passed a tariff act (1789), imposing a 5% flat rate tariff on all imports. Between 1792 and the war with Britain in 1812, the average tariff level remained around 12.5%. In 1812 all tariffs were doubled to an average of 25% in order to cope with the increase in public expenditure due to the war. A significant shift in policy occurred in 1816, when a new law was introduced to keep the tariff level close to the wartime level—especially protected were cotton, woolen, and iron goods. The American industrial interests that had blossomed because of the tariff lobbied to keep it, and had it raised to 35 percent in 1816. The public approved, and by 1820, America's average tariff was up to 40 percent.

In the 19th century, statesmen such as Senator Henry Clay continued Hamilton's themes within the Whig Party under the name "American System which consisted of protecting industries and developing infrastructure in explicit opposition to the "British system" of free trade.  Before 1860 they were always defeated by the low-tariff Democrats.

From 1846 to 1861, during which American tariffs were lowered but this was followed by a series of recessions and the 1857 panic, which eventually led to higher demands for tariffs than President James Buchanan, signed in 1861 (Morrill Tariff).

During the American Civil War (1861-1865), agrarian interests in the South were opposed to any protection, while manufacturing interests in the North wanted to maintain it. The war marked the triumph of the protectionists of the industrial states of the North over the free traders of the South. Abraham Lincoln was a protectionist like Henry Clay of the Whig Party, who advocated the "American system" based on infrastructure development and protectionism. In 1847, he declared: "Give us a protective tariff, and we will have the greatest nation on earth". Once elected, Lincoln raised industrial tariffs and after the war, tariffs remained at or above wartime levels. High tariffs were a policy designed to encourage rapid industrialisation and protect the high American wage rates.

The policy from 1860 to 1933 was usually high protective tariffs (apart from 1913 to 1921). After 1890, the tariff on wool did affect an important industry, but otherwise the tariffs were designed to keep American wages high. The conservative Republican tradition, typified by William McKinley was a high tariff, while the Democrats typically called for a lower tariff to help consumers but they always failed until 1913.

In the early 1860s, Europe and the United States pursued completely different trade policies. The 1860s were a period of growing protectionism in the United States, while the European free trade phase lasted from 1860 to 1892. The tariff average rate on imports of manufactured goods was in 1875 from 40% to 50% in the United States against 9% to 12% in continental Europe at the height of free trade.

In 1896, the GOP pledged platform pledged to "renew and emphasize our allegiance to the policy of protection, as the bulwark of American industrial independence, and the foundation of development and prosperity. This true American policy taxes foreign products and encourages home industry. It puts the burden of revenue on foreign goods; it secures the American market for the American producer. It upholds the American standard of wages for the American workingman".

In 1913, following the electoral victory of the Democrats in 1912, there was a significant reduction in the average tariff on manufactured goods from 44% to 25%. However, the First World War rendered this bill ineffective, and new "emergency" tariff legislation was introduced in 1922, after the Republicans returned to power in 1921.

According to economic historian Douglas Irwin, a common myth about United States trade policy is that low tariffs harmed American manufacturers in the early 19th century and then that high tariffs made the United States into a great industrial power in the late 19th century. A review by the Economist of Irwin's 2017 book Clashing over Commerce: A History of US Trade Policy notes:Political dynamics would lead people to see a link between tariffs and the economic cycle that was not there. A boom would generate enough revenue for tariffs to fall, and when the bust came pressure would build to raise them again. By the time that happened, the economy would be recovering, giving the impression that tariff cuts caused the crash and the reverse generated the recovery. Mr Irwin also methodically debunks the idea that protectionism made America a great industrial power, a notion believed by some to offer lessons for developing countries today. As its share of global manufacturing powered from 23% in 1870 to 36% in 1913, the admittedly high tariffs of the time came with a cost, estimated at around 0.5% of GDP in the mid-1870s. In some industries, they might have sped up development by a few years. But American growth during its protectionist period was more to do with its abundant resources and openness to people and ideas.

The economist Ha-Joon Chang disagrees with the idea that the United States has developed and reached the top of the world economic hierarchy by adopting free trade. On the contrary, according to him, they have adopted an interventionist policy to promote and protect their industries through tariffs. It was their protectionist policy that would have allowed the United States to experience the fastest economic growth in the world throughout the 19th century and into the 1920s.

Tariffs and the Great Depression
Most economists hold the opinion that the Smoot-Hawley Tariff Act in the United States did not greatly worsen the Great Depression:

Paul Krugman writes that protectionism does not lead to recessions. According to him, the decrease in imports (which can be obtained by introducing tariffs) has an expansive effect, that is, it is favorable to growth. Thus, in a trade war, since exports and imports will decrease equally, for everyone, the negative effect of a decrease in exports will be offset by the expansionary effect of a decrease in imports. Therefore, a trade war does not cause a recession. Furthermore, he points out that the Smoot-Hawley tariff did not cause the Great Depression. The decline in trade between 1929 and 1933 "was almost entirely a consequence of the Depression, not a cause. Trade barriers were a response to the Depression, partly as a consequence of deflation."

Milton Friedman held the opinion that the tariffs of 1930 did not cause the Great Depression, instead he blamed the lack of sufficient action on the part of the Federal Reserve. Douglas A. Irwin wrote: "most economists, both liberal and conservative, doubt that Smoot–Hawley played much of a role in the subsequent contraction".

Peter Temin, an economist at the Massachusetts Institute of Technology, explained that a tariff is an expansionary policy, like a devaluation as it diverts demand from foreign to home producers. He noted that exports were 7 percent of GNP in 1929, they fell by 1.5 percent of 1929 GNP in the next two years and the fall was offset by the increase in domestic demand from tariff. He concluded that contrary the popular argument, contractionary effect of the tariff was small.
 	
William Bernstein wrote: "Between 1929 and 1932, real GDP fell 17 percent worldwide, and by 26 percent in the United States, but most economic historians now believe that only a minuscule part of that huge loss of both world GDP and the United States’ GDP can be ascribed to the tariff wars. .. At the time of Smoot-Hawley's passage, trade volume accounted for only about 9 percent of world economic output. Had all international trade been eliminated, and had no domestic use for the previously exported goods been found, world GDP would have fallen by the same amount — 9 percent. Between 1930 and 1933, worldwide trade volume fell off by one-third to one-half. Depending on how the falloff is measured, this computes to 3 to 5 percent of world GDP, and these losses were partially made up by more expensive domestic goods. Thus, the damage done could not possibly have exceeded 1 or 2 percent of world GDP — nowhere near the 17 percent falloff seen during the Great Depression... The inescapable conclusion: contrary to public perception, Smoot-Hawley did not cause, or even significantly deepen, the Great Depression,"(A Splendid Exchange: How Trade Shaped the World, William Bernstein)

Jacques Sapir explains that the crisis has other causes than protectionism. He points out that "domestic production in major industrialized countries is declining...faster than international trade is declining." If this decrease (in international trade) had been the cause of the depression that the countries have experienced, we would have seen the opposite". "Finally, the chronology of events does not correspond to the thesis of the free traders... The bulk of the contraction of trade occurred between January 1930 and July 1932, that is, before the introduction of protectionist measures, even self-sufficient, in some countries, with the exception of those applied in the United States in the summer of 1930, but with negative effects. very limited. He noted that "the credit crunch is one of the main causes of the trade crunch." "In fact, international liquidity is the cause of the trade contraction. This liquidity collapsed in 1930 (-35.7%) and 1931 (-26.7%). A study by the National Bureau of Economic Research  highlights the predominant influence of currency instability (which led to the international liquidity crisis) and the sudden rise in transportation costs in the decline of trade during the 1930s .

Russia
The Russian Federation adopted more protectionist trade measures in 2013 than any other country, making it the world leader in protectionism. It alone introduced 20% of protectionist measures worldwide and one-third of measures in the G20 countries. Russia's protectionist policies include tariff measures, import restrictions, sanitary measures, and direct subsidies to local companies. For example, the government supported several economic sectors such as agriculture, space, automotive, electronics, chemistry, and energy.

India
From 2017, as part of the promotion of its "Make in India" programme to stimulate and protect domestic manufacturing industry and to combat current account deficits, India has introduced tariffs on several electronic products and "non-essential items". This concerns items imported from countries such as China and South Korea. For example, India's national solar energy programme favours domestic producers by requiring the use of Indian-made solar cells.

Armenia
Armenia, a country located in Western Asia, established its custom service in 1992 after the dissolution of the Soviet Union. When Armenia became a member of the EAEU, it was given access to the Eurasian Customs Union in 2015; this resulted in mostly tariff-free trade with other members and an increased number of import tariffs from outside of the customs union. Armenia does not currently have export taxes. In addition, it does not declare temporary imports duties and credit on government imports or pursuant to other international assistance imports. Upon joining Eurasian Economic Union in 2015, led by Russians, Armenia applied tariffs on its imports at a rate 0-10 percent. This rate has increased over the years, since in 2009 it was around three percent. Moreover, the tariffs increased significantly on agricultural products rather than on  non-agricultural products.
Armenia has committed to ultimately adopting the EAEU's uniform tariff schedule as part of its EAEU admission. Armenia will be authorized to apply customs tariffs that differ from the EAEU tariff rates until 2022, according to Decision No. 113. Some beef, pork, poultry, and dairy products; seed potatoes and peas; olives; fresh and dried fruits; some tea items; cereals, especially wheat and rice; starches, vegetable oils, margarine; some prepared food items, such as infant food; pet food; tobacco; glycerol; and gelatin are included in the list.
Membership in the EAEU is forcing Armenia to apply stricter standardization, sanitary, and phytosanitary requirements in line with EAEU—and, by extension, Russian—standards, regulations, and practices.  Armenia has had to surrender control over many aspects of its foreign trade regime in the context of EAEU membership.  Tariffs have also increased, granting protection to several domestic industries.  Armenia is increasingly beholden to comply with EAEU standards and regulations as post-accession transition periods have, or will soon, end.  All Armenian goods circulating in the territory of the EAEU must meet EAEU requirements following the end of relevant transition periods.

The Republic of Armenia has become a member of WTO in 2003, which resulted in the Most Favored Country(MFC) benefits from the organisation.  Currently, the tariffs of 2.7% implemented in Armenia are the lowers in the entire framework. Align with the  World Customs Organization (WCO), which the country is also a member of harmonized System for tariff classification, which is a method of a consistent numbering system for categorising traded goods. 

 
A customs duty or due is the indirect tax levied on the import or export of goods in international trade. In economics a duty is also a kind of consumption tax. A duty levied on goods being imported is referred to as an 'import duty', and one levied on exports an 'export duty'.

Calculation of customs duty
Customs duty is calculated on the determination of the 'assess-able value' in case of those items for which the duty is levied . This is often the transaction value unless a customs officer determines assess-able value in accordance with the Harmonized System. For certain items like petroleum and alcohol, customs duty is realized at a specific rate applied to the volume of the import or export consignments.

Harmonized System of Nomenclature
For the purpose of assessment of customs duty, products are given an identification code that has come to be known as the Harmonized System code. This code was developed by the World Customs Organization based in Brussels. A 'Harmonized System' code may be from four to ten digits. For example, 17.03 is the HS code for molasses from the extraction or refining of sugar. However, within 17.03, the number 17.03.90 stands for "Molasses (Excluding Cane Molasses)".

Introduction of Harmonized System codes in the 1990s has largely replaced the previous Standard International Trade Classification (SITC), though SITC remains in use for statistical purposes. In drawing up the national tariff, the revenue departments often specifies the rate of customs duty with reference to the HS code of the product. In some countries and customs unions, 6-digit HS codes are locally extended to 8 digits or 10 digits for further tariff discrimination: for example the European Union uses its 8-digit CN (Combined Nomenclature) and 10-digit TARIC codes.

Customs authority
The national customs authority in each country is responsible for collecting taxes on the import into or export of goods out of the country. Normally the customs authority, operating under national law, is authorized to examine cargo in order to ascertain actual description, specification volume or quantity, so that the assessable value and the rate of duty may be correctly determined and applied.

Evasion

Evasion of customs duties takes place mainly in two ways. In one, the trader under-declares the value so that the assessable value is lower than actual. In a similar vein, a trader can evade customs duty by understatement of quantity or volume of the product of trade. A trader may also evade duty by misrepresenting traded goods, categorizing goods as items which attract lower customs duties. The evasion of customs duty may take place with or without the collaboration of customs officials.

Duty-free goods
Many countries allow a traveller to bring goods into the country duty-free. These goods may be bought at ports and airports or sometimes within one country without attracting the usual government taxes and then brought into another country duty-free. Some countries specify 'duty-free allowances' which limit the number or value of duty-free items that one person can bring into the country. These restrictions often apply to tobacco, wine, spirits, cosmetics, gifts and souvenirs. Often foreign diplomats and UN officials are entitled to duty-free goods.

Deferment of tariffs and duties

Goods may be imported and stocked duty-free in a bonded warehouse: duty becomes payable on leaving the facility.  Products may sometimes be imported into a free economic zone (or 'free port'), processed there, then re-exported without being subject to tariffs or duties. According to the 1999 Revised Kyoto Convention, a "'free zone' means a part of the territory of a contracting party where any goods introduced are generally regarded, insofar as import duties and taxes are concerned, as being outside the customs territory".

Economic analysis 

Neoclassical economic theorists tend to view tariffs as distortions to the free market. Typical analyses find that tariffs tend to benefit domestic producers and government at the expense of consumers, and that the net welfare effects of a tariff on the importing country are negative due to domestic firms not producing more efficiently since there is a lack of external competition. Therefore, domestic consumers are affected since the price is higher due to high costs caused due to inefficient production or if firms aren't able to source cheaper material externally thus reducing the affordability of the products. Normative judgments often follow from these findings, namely that it may be disadvantageous for a country to artificially shield an industry from world markets and that it might be better to allow a collapse to take place. Opposition to all tariff aims to reduce tariffs and to avoid countries discriminating between differing countries when applying tariffs. The diagrams at right show the costs and benefits of imposing a tariff on a good in the domestic economy.

Imposing an import tariff has the following effects, shown in the first diagram in a hypothetical domestic market for televisions:
Price rises from world price Pw to higher tariff price Pt.
Quantity demanded by domestic consumers falls from C1 to C2, a movement along the demand curve due to higher price.
Domestic suppliers are willing to supply Q2 rather than Q1, a movement along the supply curve due to the higher price, so the quantity imported falls from C1−Q1 to C2−Q2.
Consumer surplus (the area under the demand curve but above price) shrinks by areas A+B+C+D, as domestic consumers face higher prices and consume lower quantities.
Producer surplus (the area above the supply curve but below price) increases by area A, as domestic producers shielded from international competition can sell more of their product at a higher price. 
Government tax revenue is the import quantity (C2 − Q2) times the tariff price (Pw − Pt), shown as area C.
Areas B and D are deadweight losses, surplus formerly captured by consumers that now is lost to all parties.

The overall change in welfare = Change in Consumer Surplus + Change in Producer Surplus + Change in Government Revenue = (−A−B−C−D) + A + C = −B−D. The final state after imposition of the tariff is indicated in the second diagram, with overall welfare reduced by the areas labeled "societal losses", which correspond to areas B and D in the first diagram. The losses to domestic consumers are greater than the combined benefits to domestic producers and government.

That tariffs overall reduce welfare is not a controversial topic among economists. For example, the University of Chicago surveyed about 40 leading economists in March 2018 asking whether "Imposing new U.S. tariffs on steel and aluminum will improve Americans' welfare." About two-thirds strongly disagreed with the statement, while one third disagreed. None agreed or strongly agreed. Several commented that such tariffs would help a few Americans at the expense of many. This is consistent with the explanation provided above, which is that losses to domestic consumers outweigh gains to domestic producers and government, by the amount of deadweight losses.

Tariffs are more inefficient than consumption taxes.

A 2021 study found that across 151 countries over the period 1963–2014, "tariff increases are associated with persistent, economically and statistically significant declines in domestic output and productivity, as well as higher unemployment and inequality, real exchange rate appreciation, and insignificant changes to the trade balance."

Optimal tariff 
For economic efficiency, free trade is often the best policy, however levying a tariff is sometimes second best.

A tariff is called an optimal tariff if it is set to maximize the welfare of the country imposing the tariff. It is a tariff derived by the intersection between the trade indifference curve of that country and the offer curve of another country. In this case, the welfare of the other country grows worse simultaneously, thus the policy is a kind of beggar thy neighbor policy. If the offer curve of the other country is a line through the origin point, the original country is in the condition of a small country, so any tariff worsens the welfare of the original country.

It is possible to levy a tariff as a political policy choice, and to consider a theoretical optimum tariff rate. However, imposing an optimal tariff will often lead to the foreign country increasing their tariffs as well, leading to a loss of welfare in both countries. When countries impose tariffs on each other, they will reach a position off the contract curve, meaning that both countries' welfare could be increased by reducing tariffs.

Political analysis

The tariff has been used as a political tool to establish an independent nation; for example, the United States Tariff Act of 1789, signed specifically on July 4, was called the "Second Declaration of Independence" by newspapers because it was intended to be the economic means to achieve the political goal of a sovereign and independent United States.

The political impact of tariffs is judged depending on the political perspective; for example the 2002 United States steel tariff imposed a 30% tariff on a variety of imported steel products for a period of three years and American steel producers supported the tariff.

Tariffs can emerge as a political issue prior to an election. In the leadup to the 2007 Australian Federal election, the Australian Labor Party announced it would undertake a review of Australian car tariffs if elected. The Liberal Party made a similar commitment, while independent candidate Nick Xenophon announced his intention to introduce tariff-based legislation as "a matter of urgency".

Unpopular tariffs are known to have ignited social unrest, for example the 1905 meat riots in Chile that developed in protest against tariffs applied to the cattle imports from Argentina.

Arguments in favor of tariffs

Protection of infant industry
Postulated in the United States by Alexander Hamilton at the end of the 18th century, by Friedrich List in his 1841 book  and by John Stuart Mill, the argument made in favour of this category of tariffs was this: should a country wish to develop a new economic activity on its soil, it would have to temporarily protect it. In their view, it is legitimate to protect certain activities by customs barriers in order to give them time to grow, to reach a sufficient size and to benefit from economies of scale through increased production and productivity gains. This would allow them to become competitive in order to face international competition. Indeed, a company needs to reach a certain production volume to be profitable in order to compensate for its fixed costs. Without protectionism, foreign products which are already profitable because of the volume of production already carried out on their soil would arrive in the country in large quantities at a lower price than local production. The recipient country's nascent industry would quickly disappear. A firm already established in an industry is more efficient because it is more adapted and has greater production capacity. New firms therefore suffer losses due to a lack of competitiveness linked to their 'apprenticeship' or catch-up period. By being protected from this external competition, firms can therefore establish themselves on their domestic market. As a result, they benefit from greater freedom of manoeuvre and greater certainty regarding their profitability and future development. The protectionist phase is therefore a learning period that would allow the least developed countries to acquire general and technical know-how in the fields of industrial production in order to become competitive on international market.

According to the economists in favour of protecting industries, free trade would condemn developing countries to being nothing more than exporters of raw materials and importers of manufactured goods. The application of the theory of comparative advantage would lead them to specialize in the production of raw materials and extractive products and prevent them from acquiring an industrial base. Protection of infant industries (e.g. through tariffs on imported products) would therefore be essential for developing countries to industrialize and escape their dependence on the production of raw materials.

Economist Ha-Joon Chang argues that most of today's developed countries have developed through policies that are the opposite of free trade and laissez-faire. According to him, when they were developing countries themselves, almost all of them actively used interventionist trade and industrial policies to promote and protect infant industries. Instead, they would have encouraged their domestic industries through tariffs, subsidies and other measures. In his view, Britain and the United States have not reached the top of the global economic hierarchy by adopting free trade. In fact, these two countries would have been among the greatest users of protectionist measures, including tariffs. As for the East Asian countries, he points out that the longest periods of rapid growth in these countries do not coincide with extended phases of free trade, but rather with phases of industrial protection and promotion. Interventionist trade and industrial policies would have played a crucial role in their economic success. These policies would have been similar to those used by Britain in the 18th century and the United States in the 19th century. He considers that infant industry protection policy has generated much better growth performance in the developing world than free trade policies since the 1980s.

In the second half of the 20th century, Nicholas Kaldor takes up similar arguments to allow the conversion of ageing industries. In this case, the aim was to save an activity threatened with extinction by external competition and to safeguard jobs. Protectionism must enable ageing companies to regain their competitiveness in the medium term and, for activities that are due to disappear, it allows the conversion of these activities and jobs.

Protection against dumping 
States resorting to protectionism invoke unfair competition or dumping practices:
 Monetary manipulation: a currency undergoes a devaluation when monetary authorities decide to intervene in the foreign exchange market to lower the value of the currency against other currencies. This makes local products more competitive and imported products more expensive (Marshall Lerner Condition), increasing exports and decreasing imports, and thus improving the trade balance. Countries with a weak currency cause trade imbalances: they have large external surpluses while their competitors have large deficits.
 Tax dumping: some tax haven states have lower corporate and personal tax rates. 
 Social dumping: when a state reduces social contributions or maintains very low social standards (for example, in China, labour regulations are less restrictive for employers than elsewhere).
 Environmental dumping: when environmental regulations are less stringent than elsewhere.

Free trade and poverty
Sub-Saharan African countries have a lower income per capita in 2003 than 40 years earlier (Ndulu, World Bank, 2007, p. 33). Per capita income increased by 37% between 1960 and 1980 and fell by 9% between 1980 and 2000. Africa's manufacturing sector's share of GDP decreased from 12% in 1980 to 11% in 2013. In the 1970s, Africa accounted for more than 3% of world manufacturing output, and now accounts for 1.5%. In an Op ed article for The Guardian (UK), Ha-Joon Chang argues that these downturns are the result of free trade policies, and elsewhere attributes successes in some African countries such as Ethiopia and Rwanda to their abandonment of free trade and adoption of a "developmental state model".

The poor countries that have succeeded in achieving strong and sustainable growth are those that have become mercantilists, not free traders: China, South Korea, Japan, Taiwan. Thus, whereas in the 1990s, China and India had the same GDP per capita, China followed a much more mercantilist policy and now has a GDP per capita three times higher than India's.
Indeed, a significant part of China's rise on the international trade scene does not come from the supposed benefits of international competition but from the relocations practiced by companies from developed countries. Dani Rodrik points out that it is the countries that have systematically violated the rules of globalisation that have experienced the strongest growth.

The 'dumping' policies of some countries have also largely affected developing countries. Studies on the effects of free trade show that the gains induced by WTO rules for developing countries are very small. The 2005 LINKAGE version also reduced gains to 90 billion. As for the "Doha Round", it would have brought in only  to developing countries (including China...) according to the GTAP model. However, it has been argued that the models used are actually designed to maximize the positive effects of trade liberalization, that they are characterized by the absence of taking into account the loss of income caused by the end of tariff barriers.

John Maynard Keynes, tariffs and trade deficit

The turning point of the Great Depression
At the beginning of his career, Keynes was an economist close to Alfred Marshall, deeply convinced of the benefits of free trade. From the crisis of 1929 onwards, noting the commitment of the British authorities to defend the gold parity of the pound sterling and the rigidity of nominal wages, he gradually adhered to protectionist measures.

On 5 November 1929, when heard by the Macmillan Committee to bring the British economy out of the crisis, Keynes indicated that the introduction of tariffs on imports would help to rebalance the trade balance. The committee's report states in a section entitled "import control and export aid", that in an economy where there is not full employment, the introduction of tariffs can improve production and employment. Thus the reduction of the trade deficit favours the country's growth.

In January 1930, in the Economic Advisory Council, Keynes proposed the introduction of a system of protection to reduce imports. In the autumn of 1930, he proposed a uniform tariff of 10% on all imports and subsidies of the same rate for all exports. In the Treatise on Money, published in the autumn of 1930, he took up the idea of tariffs or other trade restrictions with the aim of reducing the volume of imports and rebalancing the balance of trade.

On 7 March 1931, in the New Statesman and Nation, he wrote an article entitled Proposal for a Tariff Revenue. He pointed out that the reduction of wages led to a reduction in national demand which constrained markets. Instead, he proposes the idea of an expansionary policy combined with a tariff system to neutralise the effects on the balance of trade. The application of customs tariffs seemed to him "unavoidable, whoever the Chancellor of the Exchequer might be".Thus, for Keynes, an economic recovery policy is only fully effective if the trade deficit is eliminated. He proposed a 15% tax on manufactured and semi-manufactured goods and 5% on certain foodstuffs and raw materials, with others needed for exports exempted (wool, cotton).

In 1932, in an article entitled The Pro- and Anti-Tariffs, published in The Listener, he envisaged the protection of farmers and certain sectors such as the automobile and iron and steel industries, considering them indispensable to Britain.

The critique of the theory of comparative advantage
In the post-crisis situation of 1929, Keynes judged the assumptions of the free trade model unrealistic. He criticised, for example, the neoclassical assumption of wage adjustment.

As early as 1930, in a note to the Economic Advisory Council, he doubted the intensity of the gain from specialisation in the case of manufactured goods. While participating in the MacMillan Committee, he admitted that he no longer "believed in a very high degree of national specialisation" and refused to "abandon any industry which is unable, for the moment, to survive". He also criticised the static dimension of the theory of comparative advantage, which, in his view, by fixing comparative advantages definitively, led in practice to a waste of national resources.

In the Daily Mail of 13 March 1931, he called the assumption of perfect sectoral labour mobility "nonsense" since it states that a person made unemployed contributes to a reduction in the wage rate until he finds a job. But for Keynes, this change of job may involve costs (job search, training) and is not always possible. Generally speaking, for Keynes, the assumptions of full employment and automatic return to equilibrium discredit the theory of comparative advantage.

In July 1933, he published an article in the New Statesman and Nation entitled National Self-Sufficiency, in which he criticised the argument of the specialisation of economies, which is the basis of free trade. He thus proposed the search for a certain degree of self-sufficiency. Instead of the specialisation of economies advocated by the Ricardian theory of comparative advantage, he prefers the maintenance of a diversity of activities for nations. In it he refutes the principle of peacemaking trade. His vision of trade became that of a system where foreign capitalists compete for new markets. He defends the idea of producing on national soil when possible and reasonable and expresses sympathy for the advocates of protectionism. 
He notes in National Self-Sufficiency:

He also writes in National Self-Sufficiency:

Later, Keynes had a written correspondence with James Meade centred on the issue of import restrictions. Keynes and Meade discussed the best choice between quota and tariff. In March 1944 Keynes began a discussion with Marcus Fleming after the latter had written an article entitled Quotas versus depreciation. On this occasion, we see that he has definitely taken a protectionist stance after the Great Depression. He considered that quotas could be more effective than currency depreciation in dealing with external imbalances. Thus, for Keynes, currency depreciation was no longer sufficient and protectionist measures became necessary to avoid trade deficits. To avoid the return of crises due to a self-regulating economic system, it seemed essential to him to regulate trade and stop free trade (deregulation of foreign trade).

He points out that countries that import more than they export weaken their economies. When the trade deficit increases, unemployment rises and GDP slows down. And surplus countries exert a "negative externality" on their trading partners. They get richer at the expense of others and destroy the output of their trading partners. John Maynard Keynes believed that the products of surplus countries should be taxed to avoid trade imbalances. Thus he no longer believes in the theory of comparative advantage (on which free trade is based) which states that the trade deficit does not matter, since trade is mutually beneficial.
This also explains his desire to replace the liberalisation of international trade (Free Trade) with a regulatory system aimed at eliminating trade imbalances in his proposals for the Bretton Woods Agreement.

Trade liberalization can sometimes result in large and unequally distributed losses and gains, and can, in the short run, cause significant economic dislocation of workers in import-competing sectors.
.

Arguments against tariffs

See also

Types

Trade dynamics

Trade liberalisation
  (GATT)

References

Sources

External links

Types of Tariffs
Effectively applied tariff by Country 2008 to 2012
MFN Trade Weighted Average Tariff by country 2008–2012
World Bank's site for Trade and Tariff
Market Access Map, an online database of customs tariffs and market requirements
WTO Tariff Analysis Online – Detailed information on tariff and trade data

Customs duties
International taxation
International economics